The 2007 MBC Drama Awards is a ceremony honoring the outstanding achievement in television on the Munhwa Broadcasting Corporation (MBC) network for the year of 2007. It was held on December 30, 2007 and hosted by Shin Dong-yup and Hyun Young.

Nominations and winners
(Winners denoted in bold)

References

External links
http://www.imbc.com/broad/tv/ent/event/2007mbc/

MBC Drama Awards
MBC Drama Awards
MBC Drama Awards
December 2007 events in South Korea